Progressives United may refer to:
 a Political Action Committee formed in 2011 by former US Senator, Russ Feingold
 a British Virgin Islands political party formed in 2018 by House of Assembly member Julian Fraser